Paul Milford Muller  (1937–2013) was an American aerospace engineer, fiction author, and the co-founder of Sage Group, the United Kingdom's largest software business.

Early life and education 
Muller was born on September 30, 1937 in Los Angeles, California. Muller studied mathematics and history at California State University and later was awarded a PhD in physics: astronomy & planetary science by Newcastle University in 1975. This PhD work was published as a book, An analysis of the ancient astronomical observations with the implications for geophysics and cosmology. In 1963 Muller became a high school teacher of Mathematics in California.

Scientific career 
Muller worked for NASA at the Jet Propulsion Laboratory between 1966 and 1977 and was as a senior member of the Apollo navigation team. In 1971 Muller was awarded the Magellanic Premium award along with William L. Sjogren the for their discovery of mass concentrations in the moon's ringed basins. In 1970 Muller was made a Fellow of the Royal Astronomical Society, proposed by Harold Urey.

Later career 
In the early 1980s, Muller co-founded the business software company Sage Group along with David Goldman and Graham Wylie in Newcastle upon Tyne, England while he was a computer science lecturer at Newcastle University. Muller left Sage in 1985 and returned to the United States.

In later life Muller lived in Mae Sot, Thailand and became an author of fiction novels having three books published by Club Lighthouse in 2012; Suicide Inc., Flight of the Marbles and The Circle of Ouroboros. He also co-founded the Aarau Literary Agency in 2001.

Death 
Muller was found dead inside a house in Tak Province, Thailand in late May 2013, aged 75.

References

External links 
 

1937 births
2013 deaths
20th-century American businesspeople
20th-century American engineers
21st-century American novelists
NASA people
American aerospace engineers
Businesspeople in software
American male novelists
21st-century American male writers
American technology company founders
American computer businesspeople
Alumni of Newcastle University
California State University alumni
Fellows of the Royal Astronomical Society
Sage Group people
Businesspeople from Los Angeles
Writers from Los Angeles